This is a list of Spanish football transfers for the summer sale prior to the 2019–20 season of La Liga. Only moves from La Liga are listed.

The summer transfer window began on 1 July 2019, although a few transfers were announced prior to that date, the transferred players will not officially become part of their new club until the window's opening. The window closed at midnight on 2 September 2019. Players without a club can join one at any time, either during or in between transfer windows. Clubs below La Liga level can also sign players on loan at any time. If needed, clubs can sign a goalkeeper on an emergency loan, if all others are unavailable.

Transfers

Alavés 
Manager:  Asier Garitano  (1st season)

In

Out

Athletic Bilbao 
Manager:  Gaizka Garitano (2nd season)

In

Out

Atlético Madrid 
Manager:  Diego Simeone (9th season)

In

Out

Barcelona 
Manager:  Ernesto Valverde (3rd season)

In

Out

Celta Vigo 
Manager:  Fran Escribá (2nd season)

In

Out

Eibar 
Manager:  José Luis Mendilibar (5th season)

In

Out

Espanyol 
Manager:  David Gallego (1st season)

In

Out

Getafe 
Manager:  José Bordalás (4th season)

In

Out

Granada 
Manager:  Diego Martínez (2nd season)

In

Out

Leganés 
Manager:  Mauricio Pellegrino (2nd season)

In

Out

Levante 
Manager:  Paco López (3rd season)

In

Out

Mallorca 
Manager:  Vicente Moreno (3rd season)

In

Out

Osasuna 
Manager:  Jagoba Arrasate (2nd season)

In

Out

Real Betis 
Manager:  Rubi (1st season)

In

Out

Real Madrid 
Manager:  Zinedine Zidane (2nd season)

In

Out

Real Sociedad 
Manager:  Imanol Alguacil (2nd season)

In

Out

Sevilla 
Manager:  Julen Lopetegui (1st season)

In

Out

Valencia 
Manager:  Marcelino (3rd season)

In

Out

Valladolid 
Manager:  Sergio González (3rd season)

In

Out

Villarreal 
Manager:  Javier Calleja (2nd season)

In

Out

Notes

References

Transfers
Spain
2019